Alexander Enrique Mendoza Rodas (born June 4, 1990) is a Salvadoran professional football player, who plays as a defender.

References

External links
 

1990 births
Living people
Salvadoran footballers
El Salvador international footballers
C.D. FAS footballers
2014 Copa Centroamericana players
2015 CONCACAF Gold Cup players
2009 CONCACAF U-20 Championship players
Santa Tecla F.C. footballers
Association football defenders